Ivan Mack Matheson (November 9, 1926 – February 21, 2016), was an American politician and farmer.

Matheson was elected to the Iron County Commission in 1962. He served four terms on that body.

Matheson served as a Republican member of the Utah State Senate from 1977 until 1989. He also served on the Iron County Commission. Matheson is an alumnus of Oregon State University and was a dairy farmer. He died on February 21, 2016, in Cedar City.

Matheson was a member of the Church of Jesus Christ of Latter-day Saints. He was the first bishop of the Enoch 2nd Ward. He later served with his wife as a missionary in the Florida Tallahassee Mission, was assigned to work with the church's addiction recovery program, and for several years was a temple worker in the St. George Temple.

References

1926 births
2016 deaths
County commissioners in Utah
Farmers from Utah
Latter Day Saints from Utah
Oregon State University alumni
People from Cedar City, Utah
People from Enoch, Utah
Republican Party Utah state senators